William Cook (20 January 1909 – 11 December 1992) was a Northern Irish professional football player and manager. He was capped 15 times for Ireland.

Career
Cook began his football career in Scotland with Junior side Port Glasgow Athletic Juniors. He signed for Celtic in February 1930, and made his debut within the week in a 4–0 win over Ayr United. He established himself in the side, and at the end of the following season won a Scottish Cup medal when Celtic defeated Motherwell in the final after a replay. Cook usually played at right-back, but could also play as a left-back when the need arose.

In December 1932, Cook was transferred to Everton for £3,000. It was a surprise move at the time and he is considered one of the first high-profile players to leave Celtic mid season for another club. Cook stated that the reasons for the move were financial. He enjoyed immediate success at Goodison Park, helping Everton win the 1933 FA Cup Final with a 3–0 win over Manchester City at Wembley. On his death in December 1992, almost 60 years later, he was the last surviving player from that team. A League championship win followed in 1939, but the outbreak of World War II prevented Everton from building further on this success. In his time at Everton, Cook made 250 appearances and scored six goals.

During the war years, Cook guested for several clubs throughout Britain. Following the end of the war, he had brief spells at Wrexham and Ellesmere Port Town before joining Rhyl as player-manager in October 1946.

Cook became coach at Norwegian club SK Brann in 1947, before returning to the UK to briefly coach Sunderland. The next few years saw Cook travelling extensively; rejoining SK Brann for a couple of years, moving to South America to coach the Peru national side, before returning home in 1954 as manager of Portadown. Then after a spell as Youth team manager of Northern Ireland he went abroad again, spending a year as manager of the Iraq national side. He returned to the UK again in 1956, with spells as manager at Wigan and Crewe before becoming trainer-coach at Norwich in 1958.

References

External links
Biography
TheCelticWiki Profile

Association footballers from Northern Ireland
Pre-1950 IFA international footballers
Football managers from Northern Ireland
Expatriate football managers from Northern Ireland
People from Coleraine, County Londonderry
Everton F.C. players
Celtic F.C. players
Wrexham A.F.C. players
Rhyl F.C. players
SK Brann managers
Expatriate football managers in Iraq
Expatriate football managers in Peru
Iraq national football team managers
Peru national football team managers
Portadown F.C. managers
Wigan Athletic F.C. managers
1909 births
1992 deaths
Ellesmere Port Town F.C. players
English Football League representative players
Port Glasgow Athletic Juniors F.C. players
British expatriate sportspeople in Iraq
British expatriate sportspeople in Peru
Association football defenders
Scottish Junior Football Association players
Scottish Football League players
English Football League players

FA Cup Final players
Sportspeople from County Londonderry